Mangelia shepstonensis is a species of sea snail, a marine gastropod mollusk in the family Mangeliidae.

This is a taxon inquirendum.

Description
The length of the shell attains 4.3 mm, its diameter 2 mm.

The shell closely resembles Lienardia siren (E. A. Smith, 1904) and Drillia tholos Barnard, 1958

Distribution
This marine species occurs off Durban, South Africa.

References

External links
  Tucker, J.K. 2004 Catalog of recent and fossil turrids (Mollusca: Gastropoda). Zootaxa 682:1-1295.
 

Endemic fauna of South Africa
shepstonensis
Gastropods described in 1914